Prosser may refer to:


Places
United States
 Prosser, California, a former settlement
 Prosser Creek, California
 Prosser, Nebraska, a village
 Prosser, Washington, a city

Australia
 Electoral division of Prosser, Tasmania
 Prosser Bay, Tasmania
 Prosser River, Tasmania

High schools
 Prosser Career Academy, a vocational high school in Chicago, Illinois
 Charles Allen Prosser School of Technology, a vocational high school in New Albany, Indiana
 Prosser High School, Prosser, Washington

People
 Prosser (surname), a surname and a list of people so named
 Prosser Gifford (1929–2020), American historian, author and academic administrator

Fictional characters
 Brian Prosser, a supporting character in the BBC TV series Hinterland
 Maxwell Prosser, the main character of the indie video game Ironclad Tactics
 Oofy Prosser, a recurring character in P. G. Wodehouse stories
 Sydney Prosser, in the 2013 film American Hustle, played by Amy Adams

Other uses
 Prosser Twin Cylinder Car Company, a 19th-century American railroad freight car manufacturer

See also
 Prosser Limestone, a geologic formation in Illinois, United States
 Rosser (disambiguation)